HMS M27  was a First World War Royal Navy M15-class monitor. She was also served in the British intervention in Russia in 1919, and was scuttled in the Dvina River on 16 September 1919.

Design

Intended as a shore bombardment vessel, M27s primary armament was a single 9.2 inch Mk VI gun removed from the  HMS Theseus. In addition to her 9.2 inch gun she also possessed one 12 pounder and one six pound anti-aircraft gun. She was equipped with a four shaft Bolinder two cylinder semi-diesel engine with 560 horse power that allowed a top speed of eleven knots. The monitor's crew consisted of sixty nine officers and men.

Construction

HMS M27 ordered in March, 1915, as part of the War Emergency Programme of ship construction. She was laid down at the Sir Raylton Dixon & Co. Ltd shipyard in March 1915, launched on 8 September 1915, and completed in November 1915.

World War 1
M27 served with the Dover Patrol from December 1915 to December 1918. In early 1916, M27 had her main 9.2in gun removed, as it was required for artillery use on the Western Front, and a QF  MK I/II gun from HMS Redoubtable was fitted in lieu. This was later replaced by a  MK VII gun.

Russia
M27 next saw service, along with five other monitors (M23, M25, M31, M33 and HMS Humber),  which were sent to Murmansk in May 1919 to relieve the North Russian Expeditionary Force.  Prior to departure to Russia, M27 had her main armament replaced by a BL  triple Mk IX gun, and her 12pdr (76mm) QF Mk 1 gun replaced by a QF  AA gun.

In June, 1919, M27 moved to Archangel and her shallow draught enabled her to travel up the Dvina River to cover the withdrawal of British and White Russian forces.   M27 and her sister ship M25 were unable to be recovered when the river level fell and were scuttled on 16 September 1919 after running aground.

References

Dittmar, F. J. & Colledge, J. J., "British Warships 1914-1919", (Ian Allan, London, 1972), 

 

M15-class monitors
1915 ships
World War I monitors of the United Kingdom
Royal Navy ship names
Shipwrecks in rivers
Shipwrecks of Russia
Scuttled vessels
Maritime incidents in 1919